The 2015 FIM Motocross World Championship was the 59th F.I.M. Motocross World Championship season. It included 18 events, starting at Losail in Qatar on 28 February, and ending at San Bernardino, California in the United States on 20 September. In the main MXGP class, Tony Cairoli was the six-time defending champion, and entered the 2015 season looking to score a record seventh consecutive premier class title, for Red Bull KTM. In the MX2 class, Jordi Tixier was the defending champion, after taking the title in the final race of the 2014 season, also for Red Bull KTM. Tixier defends his title with Team Monster Energy Kawasaki.

Race calendar and results
An 18-round calendar for the 2015 season was announced on 10 October 2014. In February 2015, it was announced that the Brazilian event – scheduled to be held on 16 August in Trindade – had been cancelled due to financial and political issues. A replacement event was scheduled in Mantova, Italy.

MXGP

MX2

Participants

Rider Changes
 Gautier Paulin lost his factory Monster Energy Kawasaki ride, but moved over to the factory Honda.
 Steven Frossard also lost his factory Kawasaki ride. He moved to KTM team, Wilvo Forkrent and will compete in the British national MX1 as well as MXGP.
 Monster Energy Kawasaki signed multi-American champion Ryan Villopoto and 2008 MX2 World Champion Tyla Rattray.
 Red Bull KTM expand to three machines and sign Tommy Searle.  
 Max Nagl lost his HRC Honda ride and moved over to the factory Red Bull IceOne Husqvarna.
 Nathan Watson is signed at IceOne alongside Nagl and Todd Waters.
 24MX Honda has a completely new lineup with aged-out MX2 rider Christophe Charlier and Swede Filip Bengtsson.
 Yamaha factory expand to three riders and sign Romain Febvre.
 Dean Ferris enters series full-time with Wilvo Nestaan Husqvarna.
 Glenn Coldenhoff moves up from MX2 with Rockstar Suzuki Europe.
 Rui Goncalves signs for the new MX Racing Team Husqvarna.
 Dennis Ullrich leaves Sarholz KTM to join Castrol Power1 Suzuki. He is replaced by fellow German Angus Heidecke.
 Milko Potisek joins Tip Top Racing.
 Alessandro Lupino and Kei Yamamoto move up from MX2 with Assomotor Honda. Jose Butron also moves up with Marchetti KTM

MXGP

MX2

Championship standings

MXGP

Riders' championship

Manufacturers' championship

MX2

Riders' championship

Manufacturers' championship

References

External links

2015
2015 in motorcycle sport